The Dr. Charles and Judith Heidelberger House is a Contemporary-style house designed by Herbert Fritz Jr. and built in 1951 in Madison, Wisconsin, United States. In 2017 the house was added to the National Register of Historic Places.

History
Charles Heidelberger was a member of the faculty of what would become the University of Wisconsin–Madison. He was also a member of the National Academy of Sciences, and a world-renowned cancer researcher who developed the medication Fluorouracil.

In 1951 the Heidelbergers hired Herb Fritz Jr. to design a modern house for them. Fritz was an admirer of Frank Lloyd Wright, having been a member of the Taliesen Fellowship. He designed a modest-sized but spectacular contemporary-style house set into the hillside, with concrete block walls facing the street and expansive windows looking out the back. In 1956 the Heidelbergers added a two-story master bedroom, also designed by Herb Fritz.

In 2017 the house was added to the State and the National Register of Historic Places - "one of Herb Fritz's early masterworks."

Photos

See also

 National Register of Historic Places listings in Madison, Wisconsin

References

External links

Houses on the National Register of Historic Places in Wisconsin
National Register of Historic Places in Madison, Wisconsin
Houses in Madison, Wisconsin
Modern Movement architecture in the United States
Houses completed in 1951